Chromane (benzodihydropyran) is a heterocyclic chemical compound with the chemical formula C9H10O.  Chromane is a structural feature of more complex compounds including E vitamins (tocopherols and tocotrienols), Dianin's compound, and the pharmaceutical drugs troglitazone, ormeloxifene, and nebivolol.  Such compounds are sometimes described as chromans.

See also
 Chromene (benzopyran)

External links